New Fairfield is an unincorporated community in Fairfield Township, Franklin County, Indiana.

History
"Old" Fairfield was platted in 1815. New Fairfield was started on higher ground in the 1970s when impounding of the Brookville Reservoir destroyed the former village of Old Fairfield.

Geography

References

Unincorporated communities in Franklin County, Indiana
Unincorporated communities in Indiana